Ryan James McGowan (born 15 August 1989) is an Australian footballer who plays as a defender for St Johnstone.

He has previously played for Para Hills Knights, Heart of Midlothian, Shandong Luneng Taishan, Dundee United, Henan Jianye, Guizhou Zhicheng, Al-Sharjah, Bradford City, Sydney FC and Kuwait SC, with loan spells at Ayr United, Partick Thistle and Dundee.

McGowan has represented Australia at under-17, under-20, under-23 and at senior levels.

Club career

Heart of Midlothian
McGowan began his career at Para Hills Knights and was part of the South Australian Sports Institute, before moving to Scottish Premier League club Hearts in 2006 and was promoted to the first-team in 2008. He was the captain of Hearts' under 19 squad before making his SPL debut as substitute on 13 May that year in the final league match of the 2007–08 season against Gretna. Shortly after he signed a five-year contract with the club.

After just the one first team appearance he was sent out on loan to Ayr United in October 2009. His debut for Ayr came on 14 October, when he scored one of the goals in a 2–2 draw at home to Dundee. In January 2010, the loan was extended until the end of the season. In total, he made 30 appearances in all competitions, scoring one goal for Ayr.

On his return under new manager Jim Jefferies he played as a substitute against Hamilton on 21 August 2010, and against Celtic in September. On 15 February 2011, he joined First Division team Partick Thistle on a three-month loan deal and made his debut the same night. In all he made eight appearances before returning to Hearts at the start of April. After returning from his loan at Partick, McGowan made six more appearances for Hearts that season, with his first start for Hearts coming on 7 May 2011 against Rangers

On 23 July 2011, he started the 2011–12 season with a Sky Sports 'Man of the Match' performance against Rangers at Ibrox. He began to establish himself as a member of the first team and played in the Europa League qualifiers against Paks and in the second leg against Tottenham at White Hart Lane, where Hearts drew 0–0 (losing 5–0 on aggregate). McGowan scored his first goal for Hearts in an Edinburgh derby on 2 January. Later in the same game he headbutted Ivan Sproule in the stomach, which the referee viewed and took no action, however the SFA compliance officer opened an investigation. The compliance officer offered a two match ban. Hearts denied it was violent conduct but accepted the ban offered. The 2011–12 SPL season was a good one for McGowan, scoring 3 goals – including one in the 2012 Scottish Cup Final victory against Hibs – and winning the Hearts Young Player of the Year award.

Ahead of the last day of summer transfer window, Rangers made a bid for Hearts duo McGowan and David Templeton worth combined £1.3m valuation for the duo but the move rejected. Templeton went on to join Rangers but McGowan stayed, explaining that he needs to keep his international career status alive. On 2 January 2013, it was announced that Hearts had accepted a bid of around £400,000 from Chinese side Shandong Luneng Taishan. In all, McGowan made 73 appearances for the club.

Shandong Luneng Taishan
On 7 January 2013, McGowan signed a two-year contract with Chinese Super League side Shandong Luneng Taishan. He made his Chinese Super League debut for Shandong Luneng Taishan on 9 March 2013 against Dalian Aerbin. In his last match for Shandong, he scored the winning goal in the injury time against Jiangsu Sainty in the second leg of 2014 Chinese FA Cup final. However, Shandong Luneng decided not to extend his contract at the end of 2014 season.

Dundee United
On 23 January 2015, McGowan moved back to Scotland, signing an 18-month contract with Dundee United. He made his debut on 31 January 2015, as Dundee United beat Aberdeen 2–1 in the semi-final of the Scottish League Cup at Hampden Park.

Henan Jianye
McGowan returned to China on 21 January 2016 after he was transferred from Dundee United to Henan Jianye. The transfer fee was reported to be approximately £350,000. He made his debut by scoring an own goal as Shanghai SIPG beat Henan Jianye 5–0. On 27 January 2017, McGowan was released by Henan Jianye.

Guizhou Hengfeng Zhicheng
One month after leaving Henan Jianye, McGowan joined newly promoted Chinese Super League club Guizhou Hengfeng Zhicheng. On 3 March 2017, he made his debut for Guizhou in a 1–1 home draw against Liaoning FC.

Al-Sharjah
On 21 August 2017, McGowan joined UAE Arabian Gulf League side Al-Sharjah.

Bradford City
On 26 January 2018, Ryan joined EFL League One side Bradford City from Al-Sharjah for an undisclosed fee.

In January 2019 he was linked with a departure from the club, and a return to Scottish football with Dundee. Later that month he moved on loan to Dundee.

In May 2019, following Bradford City's relegation to League Two, it was announced that he would leave the club upon the expiry of his contract on 30 June 2019, one of 11 players to be released.

Sydney FC
On 3 July 2019, McGowan signed a two-year contract with A-League club Sydney FC, while his brother Dylan earlier joining their derby rivals Western Sydney Wanderers.

On 3 July 2021, Sydney FC announced that McGowan was leaving the club, having agreed to terms with an overseas club.

Kuwait SC
On 7 July 2021, McGowan signed with Kuwait Premier League club Kuwait SC.

St Johnstone
McGowan returned to Scottish football in July 2022, signing for St Johnstone.

International career

McGowan was part of the Australia team that qualified for the AFC Youth Championship 2008 in November 2007. McGowan was selected for the 2009 FIFA U-20 World Cup in Egypt; his brother and teammate Dylan McGowan, was not selected.

McGowan started in the first match for the Young Socceroos in the 2009 FIFA U-20 World Cup, and received a yellow and a straight red against the Czech Republic for a studs up challenge which resulted in a penalty.
He received his first call-up to the Australia senior squad in August 2012, when he was selected for the friendly match against Scotland, making his debut as a late substitute replacing Sasa Ognenovski. McGowan was booed by some sections of the home support due to his Hearts connections, with the game being played at Easter Road.

He was named in Australia's 2014 FIFA World Cup squad and provided the assist to Tim Cahill's goal in Australia 3–2 loss to the Netherlands.

Family and personal life

His parents emigrated to Australia in 1980, and McGowan was born in Adelaide into a Scottish family from Glasgow. His brother Dylan currently plays for Hamilton Academical, on loan from Kilmarnock.

Career statistics

Club

International

Honours

Club
Hearts
 Scottish Cup: 2011–12

Shandong Luneng Taishan
 Chinese FA Cup: 2014

Sydney FC
 A-League Championship: 2019–20
 A-League Premiership: 2019–20

International
Australia U-20
 AFF U19 Youth Championship: 2008

Individual
 Chinese FA Cup Most Valuable Player: 2014

Notes

References

External links

 
 
 

1989 births
Living people
Australian people of Scottish descent
Soccer players from Adelaide
Australian soccer players
Association football midfielders
Para Hills Knights players
Heart of Midlothian F.C. players
Ayr United F.C. players
Partick Thistle F.C. players
Shandong Taishan F.C. players
Dundee United F.C. players
Henan Songshan Longmen F.C. players
Guizhou F.C. players
Sharjah FC players
Bradford City A.F.C. players
Dundee F.C. players
Sydney FC players
Kuwait SC players
St Johnstone F.C. players
National Premier Leagues players
Scottish Premier League players
Scottish Football League players
Chinese Super League players
UAE Pro League players
English Football League players
Scottish Professional Football League players
A-League Men players
Kuwait Premier League players
Australia youth international soccer players
Australia under-20 international soccer players
Australia international soccer players
2014 FIFA World Cup players
2017 FIFA Confederations Cup players
Australian expatriate soccer players
Australian expatriate sportspeople in Scotland
Australian expatriate sportspeople in China
Australian expatriate sportspeople in the United Arab Emirates
Australian expatriate sportspeople in England
Australian expatriate sportspeople in Kuwait
Expatriate footballers in Scotland
Expatriate footballers in China
Expatriate footballers in the United Arab Emirates
Expatriate footballers in England
Expatriate footballers in Kuwait